Florin Cheran (born 5 April 1947) is a Romanian former footballer who played as a defender.

Club career
Florin Cheran was born on 5 April 1947 in Bucharest but spent his childhood in Râmnicu Vâlcea where he played football at junior level at local club, Unirea Râmnicu Vâlcea, also during that period he practiced athletics and volleyball, being national champion at the child level long jump. He started to play football at senior level at Divizia B club, Electronica București. Cheran went to play for Dinamo București, making his Divizia A debut on 16 August 1969, under coach Traian Ionescu in a 5–2 victory against Jiul Petroșani. He won four Divizia A titles with The Red Dogs, in the first he contributed with one goal scored in 29 matches, in the second he played 16 games, in the third he made 31 appearances and in the last one he scored 3 goals in 34 matches. After 11 seasons spent at Dinamo in which he made 284 Divizia A appearances with 8 goals scored and played 23 matches in European competitions, Cheran went to play for the team from his childhood town, Chimia Râmnicu Vâlcea for two seasons. In 1982 he returned in Divizia B at the club where he started his senior career, which this time was named Dinamo Victoria București where he was also an assistant coach. In the 1985–86 season he became Mircea Lucescu's assistant at Dinamo, also playing one game in Divizia A, which was his last, a 2–0 victory against Bihor Oradea on 8 June 1986 in which he replaced Iulian Mihăescu in the 74th minute because the team had a squad problem in that period.  Florin Cheran has a total of 326 Divizia A appearances in which he scored 8 goals.

International career
Florin Cheran played 29 matches at international level for Romania, making his debut under coach Valentin Stănescu on 5 June 1974 in a friendly which ended 0–0 against Netherlands. He played five games at the Euro 1976 qualifiers and four at the 1978 World Cup qualifiers. Cheran played three games at the 1973–76 Balkan Cup and three at the successful 1977–80 Balkan Cup. He also played 8 matches for Romania's Olympic team.

Managerial career
Florin Cheran started his managerial career while still being an active player, being Constantin Teașcă’s assistant at Dinamo Victoria București from 1982 until 1984. In 1984 he became the team's head coach, helping it gain promotion to Divizia A. Afterwards he went to be Mircea Lucescu's assistant at Dinamo București, where he would spend 15 years, being assistant to all the head coaches the club had during this time. In 2000 he was Ion Moldovan's assistant at Romania's under 21 national team, afterwards being the assistant of László Bölöni and Gheorghe Hagi at Romania's senior side. In 2002 he was Ion Moldovan's assistant at Dinamo București, afterwards he went to work for the Romanian Football Federation, being the head coach of various junior national team squads over the course of almost 9 years.

Honours

Player
Dinamo București
Divizia A: 1970–71, 1972–73, 1974–75, 1976–77
Romania
Balkan Cup: 1977–80, runner-up 1973–76

Manager
Dinamo Victoria București
Divizia B: 1984–85

References

External links
 

1947 births
Living people
Sportspeople from Bucharest
Romanian footballers
Olympic footballers of Romania
Romania international footballers
Association football defenders
Liga I players
Liga II players
Victoria București players
FC Dinamo București players
Chimia Râmnicu Vâlcea players
Romanian football managers